The Incheon Subway is a subway system serving the South Korean city of Incheon. The system is operated by Incheon Transit Corporation, and is part of the greater Seoul Metropolitan Subway.

Lines

Line 1

After six years of construction, the line opened for regular service on October 6, 1999 as the fourth subway system in South Korea, after Seoul, Busan, and Daegu. Transfers to the Seoul Metropolitan Subway can be made via Bupyeong Station to Seoul Subway Line 1, as well as the Suin Line to Seoul at Woninjae Station. A trip along the line from Gyeyang in the north to International Business District in the south takes approximately 57 minutes. The color of the line is light blue.
 
A one-station extension to Gyeyang opened in March 2007, providing transfers to AREX. A six-station south extension opened in June 2009.

The line uses 34 8-car trains. The first 25 trains were built between 1998 and 1999 by Daewoo Heavy Industries and Rotem, while the last 9 trains were built between 2007 and 2008 by Hyundai Rotem to provide trains following the extension of the line.

Line 2

After seven years of construction, the line opened for regular service on July 30, 2016. There are transfer points at Geomam (with AREX), Juan (with Seoul Subway Line 1), and Incheon City Hall (with Incheon Line 1). Line 2 has aboveground sections north of Asiad Stadium. The color of the line is Orange.

The line uses 37 2-car trains, all of which were built in 2013 by Hyundai Rotem.

Juan-Songdo Line 
It will be operated with 12 vehicles, and the driving time at the peak is 4.5 minutes.There are transfer points at Juan (with Seoul Subway Line 1), (with Incheon Subway Line 2), Citizens Park (with Incheon Subway Line 2), Inha University, Hagik, Songdo (with Suin-Bundang Line), and Incheon National University (with Incheon Subway Line 2)

Expansion

The future Line 3 is planned to be a circular line of the Incheon Subway. It will intersect Seoul Subway Line 1 at Dowon Station and Incheon Subway Line 1 at Dongmak Station. The color will be Light Green.

Fare
The basic adult fare is ₩1,250 if you pay by card and ₩1,300 if you pay in cash.

Network Map

See also
 Transport in South Korea
 Incheon
 Seoul Metropolitan Subway - the bigger urban rail system that Incheon Metro is incorporated into
 List of metro systems

References

External links
Incheon Transit Corporation – official homepage 
Incheon at UrbanRail.net 
Subway transferring information for South Korea 

 
Seoul Metropolitan Subway
subway